Latrivia Shante Nelson (born 1980) is an American novelist who writes contemporary interracial romance novels.  She is credited with writing the first interracial romance novel (bw/wm) to exceed 600 pages (Ivy's Twisted Vine, 2008).  She is also the first African-American author to write about organized crime, specifically Russian Mafia figures, as anti-heroes to African-American heroines. Her shift into writing about organized crime as a part of interracial romance created a new subgenre for the interracial (bw/wm) romance community – Interracial Romantic Suspense. Listed over 10 times as an Amazon #1 bestselling author in her genre, she has authored over twenty novels since her first book. In July 2015, she was listed as a USA TODAY bestselling author with Seeking Santa, part of a compilation with 11 additional authors called 12 Alphas 12 Months.  This box set was the first multicultural box set to ever be listed as on a USA TODAY bestseller list.

Biography
Latrivia Nelson (Artis) was born in Memphis, TN and raised in Horn Lake, MS.  After graduating high school, she earned a bachelor's degree in business administration from LeMoyne-Owen College (1998–2003).  During her time in college, she was the president of her sorority (Alpha Kappa Alpha) and Ms. LeMoyne-Owen College (2001–2002). She was also featured in Ebony. As an avid reader, she embraced the work of Brenda Jackson, Maya Angelou, Leona Blair and Gwynne Forster. Seeing that there were few interracial romance authors who wrote exclusively in the subgenre, Nelson wrote Ivy's Twisted Vine (2008).  The book was designed to highlight the complexities of "Generation X" relationships and sexual habits and the socioeconomic and cultural differences between the main characters. In 2010, she founded RiverHouse Publishing, a small press to publish independent work by unsigned authors.

In 2010, Nelson released the first book under her new publishing company.  The book entitled, Dmitry's Closet, is the first book in The Medlov Crime Family Series.  This book was Nelson's response to the lack of African-American women who were heroines in romantic-suspense novels.  It placed the heroine (Royal Stone) opposite Russian organized crime boss from the Vory v Zakone, Dmitry Medlov. Nelson, who at the time was in college to receive her Ph.D. in criminal justice with a focus on organized crime and sexual deviancy, used her studies to help write her Medlov Crime Family Series. Despite seeing many successes in writing, Nelson has always maintained duel careers as an author/publisher and public relations professional. She has worked for international and national non-profits like Church of God in Christ, ALSAC/St. Jude's Children's Research Hospital, the National Civil Rights Museum, the National NAACP and Planned Parenthood.  She has fought for social justice, education reform, women's reproductive rights and championed local political campaigns for office. She currently is the Director of Communications for Planned Parenthood Greater Memphis Region, a board member of the Boys and Girls Club (Samelson Club), the President of the Memphis Women's Political Caucus and a board member for the Tennessee Women's Political Caucus. She has published 20 novels under her name and published 6 additional authors under RiverHouse Publishing, LLC. Nelson is currently represented by Tracy Christian & TCA Jed Root.

Bibliography

 Ivy's Twisted Vine (2008)
 The World in Reverse (The Agosto Family Series) 2013
 Ivy's Twisted Vine Redux (The Agosto Family Series) 2012
 Dmitry's Closet (The Medlov Crime Family Series) 2010
 Dmitry's Royal Flush: Rise of the Queen (The Medlov Crime Family Series) 2010
 Anatoly Medlov: Complete Reign (The Medlov Crime Family Series) 2011
 Saving Anya (The Medlov Crime Family Series) 2012
 The Chronicles of Young Dmitry Medlov: Volume 1 (The Medlov Crime Family Short Stories Series)
 The Chronicles of Young Dmitry Medlov: Volume 2 (The Medlov Crime Family Short Stories Series)
 The Chronicles of Young Dmitry Medlov: Volume 3 (The Medlov Crime Family Short Stories Series)
 The Chronicles of Young Dmitry Medlov: Volume 4 (The Medlov Crime Family Short Stories Series)
 The Chronicles of Young Dmitry Medlov: Volume 5 (The Medlov Crime Family Short Stories Series) 2013
 The Chronicles of Young Dmitry Medlov: Volume 6 (The Medlov Crime Family Short Stories Series) 2014
 The Chronicles of Young Dmitry Medlov: Volume 7 (The Medlov Crime Family Short Stories Series) 2014
 The Chronicles of Young Dmitry Medlov: Book One (The Medlov Crime Family Short Stories Series) 2014
 Vasily's Revenge (The Medlov Men Series) 2014
 The Ugly Girlfriend (The Lonely Heart Series) 2010
 Finding Opa! (The Lonely Heart Series) 2011
 The Grunt (The Lonely Heart Series) 2011
 The Contingency Plan (The Lonely Heart Series) 2012
 Highness (The Lonely Heart Series) 2015
 Seeking Santa (2015)
 The Grunt 2 (The Lonely Heart Series) 2016

Personal life

Latrivia Nelson was born Latrivia Artis.
She has been married three times. 
Grandville Harris (2002–2005)
Adam Nelson (2005–2012)
Bruce Welch (2015–Present)
She has two children (Jordan Harris and Tierra Nelson).

References

External links
Official Website:  http://www.latriviawelch.com
Official Blog: http://www.latriviawelchblog.com
Official Amazon Page: https://www.amazon.com/Latrivia-S.-Nelson/e/B00377K5BC/ref=sr_tc_2_0?qid=1456260449&sr=8-2-ent
WREG TV Interview: http://wreg.com/2013/08/19/world-in-reverse/C
Commercial Appeal Interview (http://www.commercialappeal.com/entertainment/interracial-romance-writer-gains-fans-ep-390179405-324075211.html)
USA TODAY Article (http://happyeverafter.usatoday.com/2014/07/07/recommended-reads-brown-scandalous-heroes-boxed-set/)
100 Top Romance Novels on Goodreads: (http://www.goodreads.com/blog/show/487-top-100-romance-novels-on-goodreads)
Nelson Signs with TCA JED ROOT (http://cmgpr.com/interracial-romance-author-latrivia-nelson-signs-contract-with-tca-jedroo/)
Book Riot Article on Top African-American Authors (http://bookriot.com/2016/04/06/22-black-romance-novelists-not-beverly-jenkins/)

1980 births
Living people
American women novelists
21st-century American novelists
American romantic fiction novelists
Women romantic fiction writers
21st-century American women writers